Atopocelyphus is a genus of beetle flies. It is known from the Neotropical realm.

Species
A. ruficollis (Macquart, 1844)

References

Celyphidae
Diptera of South America
Lauxanioidea genera